Michél Mazingu-Sinda-Dinzey (born 15 October 1972), also known as Michél Dinzey, is a former professional footballer who played as a midfielder. Born in Germany, he represented the DR Congo national team.

Throughout his career, he has played for several clubs in Germany, including FC St. Pauli, Hertha BSC, TSV 1860 Munich, Hannover 96 and Eintracht Braunschweig.

Club career

Early career
Dinzey began playing football in his childhood, participating in youth teams in the Berlin borough of Tempelhof-Schöneberg. In 1988, he joined a Wannsee Junior-A team that played in Steglitz-Zehlendorf, an adjacent Berlin borough. At 17, he began upper-league play with the first-tier crew of the Wannsee. The following year, he switched to Lichterfelder FC, playing two years for them.

In 1994, Dinzey began his professional career with the Bundesliga, playing for VfB Stuttgart. His debut game in the Bundesliga's 1994–95 season, the first of 14 he played that year, was on 2 August – an away match against TSV 1860 Munich. In the 1995–96 season, with the prospect of becoming a regular starter, he moved to the FC St. Pauli in Hamburg. After playing in 31 games and having scored five goals for Hamburg, Dinzey was drafted to play for Zaire's national team. After the season, he returned to the Bundesliga, signing for Hertha BSC, where for two years he was a regular starter and significantly contributed to the team's success.

1860 Munich
In 1998, he accepted a DM1.3 million contract to play for the TSV 1860 Munich team as Horst Heldt's substitute.

During two years he played for Munich only 15 times, scoring one goal. In 2000, the Munich team qualified for the UEFA Champions League, but owing to differences with then-coach Werner Lorant he had little opportunity to participate in the tournament.

Hannover 96
Subsequently, he moved to play for Hannover 96 in the second Bundesliga; he earned a regular place and played 13 completed games, scoring two goals.

Vålerenga (loan)
In 2001, he was on a four-month loan to Norwegian First Division team Vålerenga, where he played ten of 13 games, scoring one goal.

Eintracht Braunschweig
In 2002, he returned to Germany, playing for Eintracht Braunschweig, but the team finished 15th and he could not prevent the team's relegation from the second Bundesliga to the then third-tier Regionalliga Nord. Despite the fall in rank, he remained in Braunschweig for the 2003–04 season, statistically his most successful; he scored 13 goals in his last season and helped his team achieve the Lower Saxony Cup.

FC St. Pauli
In 2004, he returned to the FC St. Pauli in the Regionalliga Nord, playing 88 times and scoring 24 goals during his three years in Hamburg; the team twice won the Hamburger Pokal. In 2006 the team reached the semi-finals of the DFB-Pokal but lost to eventual winners Bayern Munich.

Holstein Kiel
In 2007, St. Pauli was promoted to the Bundesliga's second division, where he was traded to play seven months for the Oberliga Nord's Holstein Kiel team. He played there for ten games and scored a goal before finally ending his playing career.

During his career, Mazingu-Dinzey played professionally in 90 Bundesliga games, 77 Regionalliga games and 220 games overall.

International career
Dinzey made his debut for the Zaire national football team on 19 January 1996 at the African Cup in Durban, South Africa, losing 2–0 to Gabon but winning 2–0 in Johannesburg against Liberia before losing 1–0 to Ghana in the quarter-finals at Port Elizabeth.

He was subsequently part of the Congolese 2000 African Cup squad hosted jointly by Nigeria and Ghana. That team played both Algeria and Gabon to scoreless ties but lost to South Africa 1–0; only South Africa and Algeria had sufficient points to advance to the quarter-finals.

His last year for the Congolese national team was at the 2004 African Cup in Tunisia, when the DR Congo squad lost to Guinea 2–1, to Tunisia 3–0 and to Rwanda 1–0. Having finished bottom of their group in the first round of competition, the team failed to secure qualification for the quarter-finals.

In total, Dinzey played 33 international caps for Congo-Kinshasa.

Coaching career
After retiring as a player Dinzey started working for the German Football Association in October 2008 as a base coach in Hamburg (Steilshoop). From 1 March to 31 December 2009 he was an assistant coach in the DR Congo in the first division team FC Saint Eloi Lupopo in the city of Lubumbashi. He became champion in 2009 and qualified for the 2010 CAF Champions League. In addition, he also worked as a consultant for Global United FC. 

After his return from Lubumbashi, he worked occasionally as a consultant and as a talent scout for the Turkish club Diyarbakırspor. In October 2011, Dinzey took over as coach at the district division club TSV Apensen (Stade). In October 2013 he became coach of the sixth division Kosova Hamburg 1977 eV. and left the club at the end of the 2013–2014 season. In December 2014 he started working for TSG 1899 Hoffenheim in the scouting the area.

In early March 2019, Mazingu-Dinzey took over the position of national coach of Antigua and Barbuda. In addition, he was entrusted with the task of promoting the development of the country's football association. On 29 March 2020, Dinzey announced his resignation.

American football
In 2011 Dinzey played as a placekicker for Hamburg based American football team St. Pauli Buccaneers, who compete in the third tier Regionalliga.

TV career
In July 2013 Dinzey took over the TV pundits role in Sport1 and acted until 1 January 2015, for live games as an online commentator on Twitter. He also appears as TV expert in coverage of regional matches of the transmitter Sport1.

Personal life
Dinzey committed to various social projects such as Nestwerk e. V. of the founder Reinhold Beckmann or in the fight against drugs and alcohol in children and adolescents in the Department of Psychiatry at the University Hospital Eppendorf in Hamburg. He is also a member of Global United FC, the football world will contest against global warming and is committed to regularly for the annual charity campaign Hamburger kicking with heart.

Dinzey is married and has two children.

References

1972 births
Living people
Footballers from Berlin
Democratic Republic of the Congo footballers
Democratic Republic of the Congo expatriate footballers
Democratic Republic of the Congo international footballers
VfB Stuttgart II players
Hertha BSC players
TSV 1860 Munich players
Hannover 96 players
FC St. Pauli players
Eintracht Braunschweig players
Holstein Kiel players
Vålerenga Fotball players
Bundesliga players
2. Bundesliga players
Norwegian First Division players
1996 African Cup of Nations players
2000 African Cup of Nations players
2004 African Cup of Nations players
Expatriate footballers in Norway
German sportspeople of Democratic Republic of the Congo descent
German players of American football
Democratic Republic of the Congo players of American football
Footballers who switched code
American football placekickers
Association football midfielders
Antigua and Barbuda national football team managers
Expatriate football managers in Antigua and Barbuda
Democratic Republic of the Congo expatriate sportspeople in Antigua and Barbuda
German football managers